Echinoporidae is a family of trematodes belonging to the order Plagiorchiida.

Genera:
 Echinoporus

References

Plagiorchiida